In digital image processing, sub-pixel resolution can be obtained in images constructed from sources with information exceeding the nominal pixel resolution of said images.

Aliasing

When an object with a certain resolution is represented on a display with lower resolution, the imperfections due to the loss of information are known as aliasing.
This can happen with geometric objects, vector graphics, vector fonts or 3D graphics.
The most common kind of visual aliasing is when a smooth object such as a line appears jagged because the pixels are large enough to be easily distinguished by the naked eye.
These effects can be reduced by anti-aliasing techniques, e.g. adjusting the colour or transparency of a pixel according to how much of it is covered by the object (sub-pixel rendering).

Example

Now sub-pixel resolution of well resolved features can measure ship movements which are an order of magnitude (10×) smaller. Movement is specifically mentioned here because measuring absolute positions requires an accurate lens model and known reference points within the image to achieve sub-pixel position accuracy. Small movements can however be measured (down to 1 cm) with simple calibration procedures. Specific fit functions often suffer specific bias with respect to image pixel boundaries. Users should therefore take care to avoid these "pixel locking" (or "peak locking") effects.

Determining feasibility
Whether features in a digital image are sharp enough to achieve sub-pixel resolution can be quantified by measuring the point spread function (PSF) of an isolated point in the image. If the image does not contain isolated points, similar methods can be applied to edges in the image. It is also important when attempting sub-pixel resolution to keep image noise to a minimum. This, in the case of a stationary scene, can be measured from a time series of images. Appropriate pixel averaging, through both time (for stationary images) and space (for uniform regions of the image) is often used to prepare the image for sub-pixel resolution measurements.

Footnotes

References

Image processing